JCRC may refer to: 

Jewish Community Relations Council, a local or regional council in the United States
Joint Clinical Research Centre, an HIV/AIDS research institution in Uganda
Japan Contents Review Center, a Japanese video and game self-censorship organization
Japan Casino Regulatory Commission, a Japanese government agency that regulates casinos